Wolverine: Bloody Choices is a  graphic novel published in 1991 by American company Marvel Comics, the second part of the Wolverine/Nick Fury trilogy. The story involves Wolverine taking an oath to protect a boy from an international criminal named Bullfinch, despite a plea deal with Nick Fury granting him (Bullfinch) immunity in exchange for crucial testimony.

Publication history
The book was republished in November 1993 and collected in Marvel Comic Exklusiv nr 17 in 1992 and again in Wolverine & Nick Fury: Scorpio in 2012.

Synopsis

During a vacation in Hawaii, Wolverine intervenes when a young boy tries to kill a man named Mr. Bullfinch, a local crime lord, but is attacked by Bullfinch's bodyguard, Shiv, who is implied to possibly be Wolverine's brother. Wolverine takes the boy to a doctor he knows, and learns he has been sexually abused by Bullfinch, who still has the boy's brother imprisoned. Wolverine tries to track down Bullfinch but finds Shiv waiting for him, and after escaping, is joined by Nick Fury, who is in town to take down Bullfinch. Together, they attack Bullfinch's mansion, and Wolverine battles Shiv once again. Bullfinch ultimately escapes, but Wolverine's continuous pursuit convinces him to make a deal with S.H.I.E.L.D. This upsets Wolverine, who wants Bullfinch to pay for his crimes, particularly the ones involving children, with his death, but Fury insists they can save more lives by letting Bullfinch live and give them information. After finding the S.H.I.E.L.D. safehouse where Bullfinch is being held, Wolverine and Fury comes to blows, with Fury fighting his best to keep his promise to protect Bullfinch but Wolverine ultimately prevailing, after which he chases down Bullfinch and kills him.

Reception
SuperMegaMonkey of Comics Chronology stated that the implied storyline with the character of Shiv felt cheap and that DeFalco went overboard with Wolverine in the end, ignoring the work that Claremont had done with Wolverine's character to help him contain his murderous side. He concluded that while the book is not terrible, (for example; having John Buscema on art was something he greatly enjoyed) he felt it was almost like an over-the-top parody of some of Wolverine's tropes as opposed to a genuine story. Andrew Young of Geek Hard stated that the book features one of the absolutely greatest fight scenes in all of comics and that the scene should also be counted among the greates Nick Fury moments of all time.

Collected editions
The overall trilogy was originally collected in the following trade paperback.

The overall trilogy was also reprinted in the Marvel Epic Collection of Wolverine.

See also
 Elektra and Wolverine: The Redeemer

Notes

References

External links

1991 graphic novels
Marvel Comics graphic novels
Nick Fury
Wolverine (comics) titles